Cycadidae is a subclass of Equisetopsida in the sense used by Mark W. Chase and James L. Reveal in their 2009 article "A phylogenetic classification of the land plants to accompany APG III." This subclass comprises the cycads, which include the two families Cycadaceae and Zamiaceae.

Phylogeny
The following diagram shows a likely phylogenic relationship between subclass Cycadidae and the other Equisetopsida subclasses.

References

Equisetopsida sensu lato
Plant subclasses